In enzymology, a geranylgeranylglycerol-phosphate geranylgeranyltransferase is an enzyme that catalyzes the chemical reaction

geranylgeranyl diphosphate + sn-3-O-(geranylgeranyl)glycerol 1-phosphate  diphosphate + 2,3-bis-O-(geranylgeranyl)glycerol 1-phosphate

Thus, the two substrates of this enzyme are geranylgeranyl diphosphate and sn-3-O-(geranylgeranyl)glycerol 1-phosphate, whereas its two products are diphosphate and 2,3-bis-O-(geranylgeranyl)glycerol 1-phosphate.

This enzyme belongs to the family of transferases, specifically those transferring aryl groups or alkyl groups other than methyl groups.  The systematic name of this enzyme class is geranylgeranyl diphosphate:sn-3-O-(geranylgeranyl)glycerol 1-phosphate geranylgeranyltransferase. Other names in common use include geranylgeranyloxyglycerol phosphate geranylgeranyltransferase, and geranylgeranyltransferase II.

Structural studies

References

 

EC 2.5.1
Enzymes of known structure